Orekhovo is the name of several rural localities in Russia:

Modern localities

Altai Krai
As of 2012, one rural locality in Altai Krai bear this name:
Orekhovo, Altai Krai, a selo in Burlinsky District

Belgorod Oblast
As of 2012, one rural locality in Belgorod Oblast bear this name:
Orekhovo, Belgorod Oblast, a selo in Valuysky District

Leningrad Oblast
As of 2012, two rural localities in Leningrad Oblast bear this name:

Orekhovo (settlement), Leningrad Oblast, a settlement in Sosnovskoye Rural Settlement of Priozersky District
Orekhovo (village), Leningrad Oblast, a village in Sosnovskoye Rural Settlement of Priozersky District

Orekhovo, name of several other rural localities